Catrin Kean or Catrin Clarke is a Welsh writer. Her debut novel Salt won the Wales Book of the Year in 2021.  Writing as Catrin Clarke, she won a BAFTA Cymru award for screenwriting in 2003 for her work on the BBC Wales drama Belonging.

Early life 
Kean was born in Wales, and is of Welsh, Irish and Bajan heritage. She is based in Cardiff.

Career 

Kean is a scriptwriter who has written for film, television and radio, with credits including Casualty, Mistresses and Wolfblood. 

Kean's first novel Salt was published by Gomer Press in 2020. The novel tells the story of the author's Welsh great-grandmother Ellen meeting and marrying her great-grandfather Samuel, a ship’s cook from Barbados, in 1878 and subsequently travelling with him at sea. Dealing with themes of racism, class and British hegemony, Salt was praised by Nation.Cymru as 'a novel for our times' in light of the Black Lives Matter movement, while Wales Arts Review called it 'a gripping love story of significant cultural importance...set against the intergenerational, inherited trauma caused by slavery and colonialism.' At the 2021 Wales Book of the Year Awards, Salt won the 'triple crown': taking the Rhys Davies Trust Fiction Award, the Wales Arts Review People's Choice Award and the overall prize for Wales Book of the Year.

Bibliography

Novels 

 Salt (2020)

Short fiction

References 

Living people
Welsh women novelists
21st-century Welsh women writers
Year of birth missing (living people)
Welsh short story writers
21st-century Welsh novelists